Icy Phoenix is a CMS (Content Management System) based on phpBB (an open-source Internet Forum package powered by PHP) plus many modifications and code integrations which add features to the whole package.
Icy Phoenix has some features originally developed for phpBB XS Project which was founded by Bicet and then developed by both Bicet (who later started slimbb) and Mighty Gorgon (Luca Libralato).
Icy Phoenix has been created by Mighty Gorgon after he left the phpBB XS Project.

Features
phpBB bulletin board and permission system
CMS features allowing the creation of new pages and blocks (some of the functions are based on the abandoned IM Portal project).
Overall template integration among all site sections.
Many ready to use features: Photo Gallery, Downloads, Knowledge Base, Links, Chat.
Multilanguage and multitemplate ready.
Almost 100% XHTML and CSS W3C compliant.

Many of these features are based on mods for phpbb though some may have been written or rewritten by Mighty Gorgon. Others have been ported from phpbb3.

Installation
Icy Phoenix has its own setup procedure which guides the user through the steps of the setup process. An upgrade file is provided to upgrade the package from standard phpBB and phpBB XS. At the moment the only way to upgrade from another premodded package is by downgrading it to phpBB (there is a written procedure for this) and then run the provided upgrade procedure.

Compatibility with phpbb mods 
Many phpbb 2 mods work with Icy Phoenix and most can with a little effort be made to work on Icy Phoenix. There is a subforum of downloadable mods that have been made to work on the forum software at the official website.

Other languages
English is the main language of Icy Phoenix, but it has been translated into other languages (alphabetical order): Catalan, Dutch, Galego, German, Italian, Serbian, Spanish. Many authors work on translations.

Requirements 
At least 20 MB of free space in the folder you would like to install the package.
Web server with PHP (4 or higher) installed and running (works best on Linux + Apache).
MySQL (3 or higher) database with at least 1MB of free space.
Ability to set CHMOD permissions.

These other requirements (even if not strictly needed) are suggested for optimal performance of Icy Phoenix:
Web server with .htaccess capability
Apache Rewrite Mod installed and running
GD Libraries (at least 2.0.28) installed and running
Register Globals set to OFF

References

External links
 
 phpBB official website
Support
Support
Support
Support
Support
Support

Free Internet forum software
Free software programmed in PHP
Free groupware